The 2013 Canadian Wheelchair Curling Championship was held from March 24 to 31 at the RA Centre in Ottawa, Ontario. Quebec, skipped by Benoit Lessard, won their first Canadian wheelchair title by defeating British Columbia, skipped by Paralympian Gary Cormack.

Teams
The teams are listed as follows:

Round-robin standings
Final round-robin standings

Round-robin results
All draw times are listed in Eastern Daylight Time (UTC−4).

Draw 1
Monday, March 25, 10:00 am

Draw 2
Monday, March 25, 3:00 pm

Draw 3
Tuesday, March 26, 10:00 am

Draw 4
Tuesday, March 26, 3:00 pm

Draw 5
Wednesday, March 27, 10:00 am

Draw 6
Wednesday, March 27, 3:00 pm

Draw 7
Thursday, March 28, 12:30 pm

Draw 8
Thursday, March 28, 5:00 pm

Draw 9
Friday, March 29, 10:00 am

Playoffs

1 vs. 2
Saturday, March 30, 10:00

3 vs. 4
Saturday, March 30, 15:00

Semifinal
Sunday, March 31, 10:00 am

Gold medal game
Sunday, March 31, 3:00 pm

Awards
The awards and the all-star team are listed as follows:

All-star team
Leads:  Johanne Daly, Quebec;  Alison Duddy, British Columbia
Second:  Mark Wherrett, Manitoba
Third:  Frank LaBounty, British Columbia
Skip:  Benoit Lessard, Quebec

Sportsmanship award
 Sébastian Boisvert, Quebec second

References

External links

Curling in Ottawa
Canadian Wheelchair Curling Championships
Wheelchair Curling Championship 
2010s in Ottawa
Wheelchair Curling Championship